State Road 229 (NM 229) is a state highway in the US state of New Mexico. NM 229's southern terminus is at U.S. Route 285 (US 285) in Atoka, and the northern terminus is in the city of Artesia at US 285.

Major intersections

See also

References

229
Transportation in Eddy County, New Mexico